A word is a unit of language.

Word(s) may also refer to:

Computing and computer science
Word (computer architecture), a group of bits or digits/characters processed as a unit
Word (formal language theory), a finite sequence of letters taken from an alphabet
Word, a finite string of symbols in automata theory
words (Unix), a standard file in UNIX
Microsoft Word, a word-processing application
Calligra Words, a word-processing application
William Whitaker's Words, a program for translating Latin

Lexicography
Word (journal), the journal of the International Linguistic Association (formerly the Linguistic Circle of New York)

Mathematics
Word (group theory), a product of group elements and their inverses

Media
WORD (AM), a radio station (950 AM) in Spartanburg, South Carolina, United States
WORD-FM, a radio station (101.5 FM) in Pittsburgh, Pennsylvania, United States
Word Magazine, an influential online magazine, active from 1995 to 2000
Word: Live at Carnegie Hall, a Louis C.K. live comedy album
Word Books, an imprint of publisher Thomas Nelson

Music

Record Labels
Word Records, a record label

Albums
Words (Sherrié Austin album), 1997
Words (Tony Rich album), 1996
Words (F. R. David album), 1982
Words (Sara Evans album) and title track, 2017

Songs
"The Word" (song), 1965 song by the Beatles
"Words" (Alesso song), 2022
"Words" (Bee Gees song), 1968
"Words" (The Christians song), 1989
"Words" (Anthony David song), 2008
"Words" (F. R. David song), 1982
"Words" (Daya song), 2016
"Words I Never Said", aka "Words" by Skylar Grey, 2012
"Words" (Kate Miller-Heidke song), 2007
"Words" (The Monkees song), 1967
"Words", song by Alien Ant Farm from the 2003 album Truant
"Words", song by Cheap Trick from the 2003 album Special One
"Words", song by Doves from The Last Broadcast
"Words", a song by Naaz from Bits of Naaz
"Words", song by Gregory Alan Isakov, from This Empty Northern Hemisphere
"Words", song by Low from I Could Live in Hope, 1994
"Words", song by Madonna from Erotica
"Words", song by Missing Persons
"Words", song by Days of the New from their 2001 album
"Words", song by Hawk Nelson from their 2013 album Made
"The Word", song by Patti Scialfa from her 2007 album Play It as It Lays
"Words", song by Train from the 2009 album Save Me San Francisco
"Words", song by Lucinda Williams from the 2007 album West
"Words (Between the Lines of Age)", song by Neil Young from Harvest

See also
The Word (disambiguation)
Word FM (disambiguation)
Word count, the number of words in a document or passage of text
Word stem, a part of a word used with slightly different meanings
Word (surname), people with the surname "Word"